HD Media Co., LLC is a Huntington, West Virginia, based publisher of daily and weekly newspapers and magazines. It was established by Doug Reynolds in 2013 to purchase the Herald-Dispatch from Champion Industries.

Newspapers

The Herald-Dispatch 
In 2013, HD Media purchased The Herald-Dispatch from Champion Industries.

The Herald-Dispatch was founded in 1909 when two Huntington newspapers, the Herald and the Dispatch, merged.[3] In 1927, the newspaper became a part of the Huntington Publishing Company, operated by Joseph Harvey Long, the owner of the Huntington Advertiser. The company was operated by the Long family until 1971, when it was sold to the Honolulu Star Bulletin and then to the Gannett Company ten months later.[3] Its companion afternoon paper, the Huntington Advertiser, ceased as a separate publication in 1979. Prior to the Huntington Advertiser’s demise, the combined Sunday newspaper was referred to as the Herald-Advertiser, correctly depicted in the movie We Are Marshall. Today, it also publishes the Putnam Herald and the Lawrence Herald, more localized editions of The Herald-Dispatch serving Putnam County, West Virginia and Lawrence County, Ohio, respectively.

Charleston Gazette-Mail 

On March 8, 2018, HD Media, the Herald-Dispatch's holding company, was declared the successful bid in the auction for the Charleston Gazette-Mail after the paper had declared bankruptcy.

The Charleston Gazette-Mail is the only daily morning newspaper in Charleston, West Virginia. It is the product of a July 2015 merger between the Charleston Gazette and the Charleston Daily Mail.

The Gazette traces its roots to 1873. At the time, it was a weekly newspaper known as the Kanawha Chronicle. It was later renamed The Kanawha Gazette and the Daily Gazette—before its name was officially changed to The Charleston Gazette in 1907. In 1912 it came under the control of the Chilton family, who have owned it until its bankruptcy in 2018. William E. Chilton, a U.S. senator, was publisher of The Gazette, as were his son, William E. Chilton II, and grandson, W.E. "Ned" Chilton III, Yale graduate and classmate/protégé of conservative columnist William F. Buckley, Jr. Ironically, the paper's opinion page, usually on the left, carried Buckley's column until Buckley's death.

Ned Chilton used to claim that the job of a newspaper was to "comfort the afflicted and afflict the comfortable."  The newspaper's liberal reputation was enhanced by principal editorial writer and columnist L.T. Anderson, associate editor and two-time runner-up for the Pulitzer Prize. Anderson later moved to the rival Daily Mail as a columnist after he was passed over for an editorial position at the Gazette, and often used his Daily Mail column to snipe at his former employer.

The Daily Mail was founded in 1914 by former Alaska Governor Walter Eli Clark and remained the property of his heirs until 1987.  Governor Clark described the newspaper as an "independent Republican" publication.  In 1987, the Clark heirs sold the paper to the Toronto-based Thomson Newspapers.  The new owners moderated the political views of the paper to some degree.  In 1998, Thomson sold the Daily Mail to the Denver-based MediaNews Group. The newspaper published in the afternoons, Monday-Saturday, with a Sunday morning edition, until 1961; Monday – Saturday afternoons from 1961–2005, Monday – Friday afternoons from 2005–2009, and Monday – Friday mornings from 2009–2015.

Other papers 
In 2014, The Herald-Dispatch parent company HD Media acquired the Wayne County News in Wayne, West Virginia. In 2017, HD Media acquired the Logan Banner, Williamson Daily News, the Coal Valley News in Madison and The Pineville Independent Herald in Pineville from Civitas Media.

Antitrust lawsuit against Google and Facebook 
In February 2021, HD Media filed an antitrust lawsuit against Google and Facebook in the U.S. District Court for the Southern District of West Virginia on the basis of digital advertising manipulation. According to News Media Alliance, this is the first lawsuit of its kind being filed by a news outlet. Managing director Doug Reynolds has stated in an interview that "“These companies are more powerful than Standard Oil in its heyday, so no one wants to be the first to take them on. We felt the political and legal climate have moved in our favor and are ready to go ahead.” Paul Farrell, the lead lawyer for the suit has pointed out the digital advertising revenue of the company has declined despite a growing digital audience. Mr. Reynolds has reportedly spoken with other publishers and expects some will join the suit in the future.

Assets 
Charleston Gazette-Mail
Coal Valley News
Herald-Dispatch
Logan Banner
The Pineville Independent Herald in Pineville
Williamson Daily News
Wayne County News

References 

Newspaper companies of the United States
Companies based in West Virginia
Huntington, West Virginia
2013 establishments in West Virginia